Hansfield railway station is a railway station in Fingal, Ireland. It lies on the Docklands to M3 Parkway Commuter service and serves the housing estates of Ongar and Barnwell in the townland of Hansfield.

Services at Hansfield station

The station is served by 47 trains Monday to Friday, and offers a typical journey time of 39 minutes to/from Docklands railway station at peak.

From Ongar, passengers can walk directly to Hansfield train station and travel to Docklands, Broombridge, Ashtown, Navan Road Parkway, Castleknock, and Coolmine at peak times Monday to Friday only. Direct travel is possible to Clonsilla, Dunboyne and M3 Parkway on services 7 days a week.

Passengers transfer at Clonsilla:
to travel at non peak times (including Saturday and Sunday) towards Dublin city centre.
to travel to Maynooth and both Leixlip stations. Transfer at Maynooth for InterCity services to Sligo.
to travel to Drumcondra. Only Maynooth to Dublin services serve Drumcondra.

History

The station was planned by Fingal County Council as part of Hansfield Strategic Development Zone. While the railway line was opened in September 2010 as planned, Hansfield station remained closed because no road access to the station from the surrounding housing estates existed. When funding was provided in 2011 for the access road,  Iarnród Éireann took possession of land to proceed. The station opened on Friday 28 June 2013.

See also
 List of railway stations in Ireland

References

External links
  Irish Rail Hansfield Station Website 
 Hansfield opening day from photo website of 'The Wanderer'

Iarnród Éireann stations in Fingal
Railway stations in Fingal
Railway stations opened in 2013